The 1974–75 Irish Cup was the 95th edition of the premier knock-out cup competition in Northern Irish football. 

Coleraine won the cup for the 3rd time, defeating Linfield 1–0 in the second final replay at the Ballymena Showgrounds after the previous two matches ended in draws.

The holders Ards were eliminated in the first round by Cliftonville.

Results

First round

|}

Replay

|}

Quarter-finals

|}

Semi-finals

|}

Final

Replay

Second replay

References

External links
The Rec.Sport.Soccer Statistics Foundation - Northern Ireland - Cup Finals

Irish Cup seasons
1974–75 in Northern Ireland association football
1974–75 domestic association football cups